Philaenarcys bilineata, the prairie spittlebug, is a species of spittlebug in the family Aphrophoridae. It is found in North America. Habitats it can be found in include prairies and boreal forests.

References

Articles created by Qbugbot
Insects described in 1831
Aphrophoridae